Connor Heyward (born January 22, 1999) is an American football tight end and fullback for the Pittsburgh Steelers of the National Football League (NFL). He played college football at Michigan State.

Early life and high school career
Heyward grew up in Duluth, Georgia and attended Peachtree Ridge High School.

College career
Heyward rushed for ten yards on three carries and caught four passes for 13 yards and one touchdown. As a sophomore, he rushed 118 times for 529 yards and five touchdowns and had 32 catches for 249 yards. After losing his starting position after the first game of his junior season to Elijah Collins Heyward later left the team and entered the NCAA transfer portal. He later returned to the team and redshirted the year. Heyward led the Spartans with 65 carries and had 200 rushing yards and two touchdowns with 18 receptions for 71 yards and two touchdowns in the team's COVID-19-shortened 2020 season. Prior to his redshirt senior season, Heyward moved from running back to H-back and tight end. He caught 35 passes for 326 yards and two touchdowns in his final season.

Professional career

Heyward was selected in the sixth round with the 208th overall pick in the 2022 NFL Draft by the Pittsburgh Steelers.

Heyward scored his first professional touchdown during Week 13 at the Atlanta Falcons, a 17-yard catch, getting both feet inbounds at the back of the end zone.

NFL career statistics

Personal life
Heyward is the son of Pro Bowl NFL player Craig Heyward. His older brother, Cameron Heyward, is an All-Pro defensive tackle for the Pittsburgh Steelers.

References

External links
 Pittsburgh Steelers bio
Michigan State Spartans bio

1999 births
Living people
Players of American football from Georgia (U.S. state)
American football fullbacks
American football tight ends
Michigan State Spartans football players
Pittsburgh Steelers players